Wilding Picture Productions, Inc. (also known as Wilding Studios or Wilding) was a major supplier of audio-visual communications services, involved primarily in the production and distribution of motion pictures, slidefilms, TV commercials, and business shows. It produced industrial films for many corporations on a wide range of subjects, from expounding proper use of the company's products to productivity. During World War II, it was the main supplier of war-related films for the United States Armed Forces.

History

1914–1936: Detroit period 
The company was founded in Detroit by Norman Wilding (1892–1947), in 1914.

1937–1966: Chicago Essanay Studio period 
In 1937, Wilding moved into the Essanay Building in Chicago, once owned by Essanay Film Manufacturing Company. Over the next few decades, Wilding became one of the country's biggest producers of industrial films. At its peak, the company owned studios in Chicago, Detroit and New York. In 1958, Wilding produced around 100 to 125 major business films, at a total cost of about 130 million dollars. Its customers included Ford, Chrysler, Goodyear, General Electric, U.S. Steel, Alcoa, and Amoco

During the Second World War, Wilding produced many films for the US Armed Services. These included training films such as Combat Fatigue: Insomnia (1945), an educational film used to teach soldiers how to overcome insomnia; and product promotion films such as Heritage for Victory (ca.1940s) and Army on Wheels (1940), which concentrated on vehicles and technologies used in World War II.

1967–Now: Closure 
In 1967, Wilding was acquired by local Chicago projector manufacturer Bell & Howell, which ultimately closed Wilding's Chicago unit in 1972. Bell & Howell donated the real estate to Ch. 11, which in turn sold the property. Wilding's exhibits division and creative operations for the John Deere account remained in business in downtown Chicago until 1985.

Wilding was sold to Maritz, LLC on January 4, 1981. Maritz merged Wilding with their existing film and events production subsidiary, Communico, and named the new company Maritz Communications. Wilding's heavily unionized labor force did not blend well with Maritz's non-union culture, and over the subsequent five years, Maritz sold or closed down several Wilding operating units. These included event staging equipment rental, film editing, sound studios and major exhibit production.

Maritz Communications closed in 1992, and film and events clients were serviced by Maritz, LLC. In 1997, Maritz, LLC spun-off video production operations to Visiontracks, and meetings and events to EventSource. Maritz, LLC kept a creative group employed until 2009, when all media and event operations were closed.

Partial filmography

References

External links 
The Ship Is Ours on YouTube
 Wilding Picture Productions at the Internet Archive

American companies established in 1914
Film production companies of the United States